The 160th Street station was a station on the demolished section of the BMT Jamaica Line in Queens, New York City.

History 
This station was built as part of the Dual Contracts. It opened on July 3, 1918, thirteen years after the closing of New York Avenue Station along the Atlantic Avenue Rapid Transit line. During its early years, it had connections to five different trolley companies; the New York and Long Island Traction Company, the Long Island Electric Railway, the Manhattan and Queens Traction Company, the New York and Queens County Railway, and the Brooklyn and Queens Transit Corporation and its predecessors.

This station closed on September 10, 1977, with the Q49 bus replacing it until December 11, 1988, in anticipation of the Archer Avenue Subway and due to political pressure in the area.

This station along with the 168th Street and Sutphin Boulevard stations was demolished in 1979. It was replaced by the Jamaica Center–Parsons/Archer station, which opened on December 11, 1988. Between the closing of the el station and its replacement subway station, the existing Parsons Boulevard station, four blocks to the north on Hillside Avenue, served as a temporary substitute.

Station layout 
This elevated station had three tracks and two side platforms.

References

External links
 
 

Railway stations in the United States opened in 1916
1916 establishments in New York City
Railway stations closed in 1977
Defunct BMT Jamaica Line stations
1977 disestablishments in New York (state)
1918 establishments in New York City
Former elevated and subway stations in Queens, New York